Duck Rock is an album released by British impresario Malcolm McLaren. It was originally issued in 1983 by Charisma Records, Virgin Records, and Chrysalis Records, and later re-released on CD in 1987. The album mixes up styles from South Africa, Central and South America, the Caribbean, and the United States, including hip hop. The album proved to be highly influential in bringing hip hop to a wider audience in the United Kingdom. Two of the singles from the album, "Buffalo Gals" and "Double Dutch", became major chart hits on both sides of the Atlantic. Duck Rock was dedicated to Harry McClintock, better known as Haywire Mac. The album artwork was designed by Dondi White and Nick Egan, with the illustration by Keith Haring.

Guest musicians featured on this album include Trevor Horn, Anne Dudley, J. J. Jeczalik, and Thomas Dolby. Side recordings that Horn, Dudley and Jeczalik made in between takes of Duck Rock would eventually become the first album of the Art of Noise, Into Battle with the Art of Noise. Clips of the World's Famous Supreme Team radio show appear between songs, which made the album one of the earliest recordings on which members of the Nation of Gods and Earths appear.

Reception

In a contemporary review of the album, The Village Voices Robert Christgau found that "McLaren knows how to record African music for Western ears, and the ebullient tunes he's collected here more than make up for his annoyance quotient", but also criticised McLaren and Horn for failing to give credit to the South African musicians involved in the recording, such as Mahlathini and the Mahotella Queens. The mbaqanga group the Boyoyo Boys took legal action against McLaren over the similarity of "Double Dutch" with its own hit "Puleng". After a lengthy legal battle in the UK, the matter was settled out of court, with payment made to the South African copyright holders, songwriter Petrus Maneli and publisher Gallo Music, but Horn and McLaren retained their songwriting credits.

Duck Rock was ranked at number nine among the "Albums of the Year" for 1983 by NME. The album ultimately became a critical favourite, garnering accolades from various other publications in the years following its release. William Ruhlmann of AllMusic retrospectively reviewed it as "an amazingly eclectic collection of world music mixed with urban hip-hop". In 2013, NME ranked Duck Rock at number 298 on its list of the 500 greatest albums of all time. In 2018, Pitchfork ranked Duck Rock at number 200 on its list of the 200 best albums of the 1980s. The album also received BBC Two's Critical Music label.

Track listing

More tracks
"Buffalo Gals – Special Stereo Scratch Mix" (Horn, Dudley, McLaren)
"Zulus on a Time Bomb" (Horn, McLaren)
"She's Looking Like a Hobo" (Horn, McLaren)
"Double Dutch – New Dance Mix" (Horn, McLaren)
"Roly Poly" (Horn, McLaren)
"D'ya Like Scratchin'? – with the Red River Gals" (Horn, Dudley, McLaren)
"World's Famous – Radio ID" (Horn, Dudley, McLaren)
"Buffalo Gals - Trad. Square" (Horn, McLaren)
"Hobo Scratch" (Horn, McLaren)
"Hobo Scratch (Long Edit.)" (Horn, McLaren)
"D'ya Like Scratchin'? - Special Version" (Horn, Dudley, McLaren)

Personnel
 Malcolm McLaren – figure caller, singer (known as Talcy Malcy)
 Sedivine the Mastermind – DJ, rapper (known as Divine)
 Just Allah the Superstar – DJ, rapper (known as Justice)
 Trevor Horn – producer, beats, mixing - (Art of Noise)
 Anne Dudley – arranger, keyboards, string arrangements - (Art of Noise)
 Thomas Dolby – keyboards
 Gary Langan – Jew's harp, engineer - (Art of Noise)
 J.J. Jeczalik – synthesizer - (Art of Noise)
 David Birch – guitar
 Luís Jardim – percussion
 Mahlathini and the Mahotella Queens — vocals, uncredited
 Boyoyo Boys — musicians, uncredited
additional musicians uncredited - bass guitar, backing vocals
Technical
 Keith Haring – illustration
 Dondi White – graffiti
 Nick Egan – cover design
 Ron West – created Ghetto Blaster for Album Cover design
 Mastered At – The Town House

Charts

Weekly charts

Year-end charts

Certifications

References

External links

Duck Rock (Adobe Flash) at Spotify (streamed copy where licensed)

1983 debut albums
Malcolm McLaren albums
Albums produced by Trevor Horn
Hip hop albums by English artists
Island Records albums
Charisma Records albums